2K17 may refer to:

 the year 2017
 NBA 2K17, 2016 video game
 WWE 2K17, 2016 video game